Noble L. Clay was an American college basketball coach. He was the men's basketball head coach of the Trinity Blue and White (now the Duke Blue Devils) in 1914 and 1915. Clay also served as the captain of the Durham YMCA team, which sometimes played against Trinity, at that time.

Head coaching record

References

External links
Noble Clay at Sports-Reference.com

Duke Blue Devils men's basketball coaches